Caudebec-lès-Elbeuf (literally Caudebec near Elbeuf) is a commune in the Seine-Maritime department in the Normandy region in northern France.

Geography

It used to be the site of the Caudebec bore, or tidal wave, which several times a year rushed up the river from the sea. However the tidal estuary was changed to improve shipping access and the bore ceased to function.

Heraldry

Population

Places of interest
 The church of Notre-Dame, dating from the twelfth century.
 A twentieth-century château.

Twin towns
 Dereham, England
 Vigarano Mainarda, Italy
 Bad Dürrenberg, Germany
 Prague - Libuš, Czech Republic

See also
Communes of the Seine-Maritime department

References

External links

Official town website 

Communes of Seine-Maritime